Alkalilactibacillus ikkensis is a Gram-positive and endospore-forming bacterium from the genus of Alkalilactibacillus.

References

Bacillaceae
Bacteria described in 2016